Atimiola guttulata is a species of beetle in the family Cerambycidae. It was described by Bates in 1880. It is known from Belize, Mexico, Costa Rica, Guatemala, Honduras, and Nicaragua.

References

Desmiphorini
Beetles described in 1880